Charles Long, 1st Baron Farnborough  (2 January 1760 – 17 January 1838) was an English politician and connoisseur of the arts.

Early life
Born in London, he was the fourth surviving son of West Indies merchant Beeston Long and his wife Sarah Cropp. A senior branch of the family of Hurts Hall in Suffolk established themselves in Jamaica after the conquest of the island in 1665. Educated at a private school in Greenwich and at  Emmanuel College of Cambridge University, Long matriculated in 1779, but is not known to have taken a degree. He was entered at the Inner Temple, later making the grand tour between 1786 and 1788, exploring Rome and laying the foundation of his art collection under the tuition of James Byres.

Political career 
Long was a friend of William Pitt, whom he had met at Cambridge, and his involvement in politics began as early as 1788 when he was canvassing for Lord Hood, the ministerial candidate in the Westminster election, and he himself entered parliament in January 1789 as member for Rye, a Treasury controlled seat. He afterwards sat as member for Midhurst (1796–1802) and for Wendover (1802–06), (boroughs whose parliamentary representatives were nominated by Pitt's friend Lord Carrington) and for Haselmere (1806–26), where the sole patron was the Pittite Earl of Lonsdale.  Becoming junior secretary to the Treasury in 1791, he acted as parliamentary whip and teller and in 1796 on the government's behalf, undertook much of the general election management.  In 1801 when Pitt left office, Long followed, and was rewarded with a yearly pension of £1500. At Pitt's behest he was appointed Treasury advisor to the Prime Minister Henry Addington, and in 1802 was sworn of the Privy Council.

The following year his house at Bromley Hill in Kent was the location for negotiations between Pitt and Addington, in which he was the chief intermediary. When Pitt returned to power in 1804 Long was made a lord of the Treasury (1804–06) and then chief secretary to the Lord Lieutenant of Ireland (1805–06). During his brief tenure in Dublin he was prevailed upon to visit Anne Devlin, a co-conspirator in the republican rising Robert Emmet had staged in the city in July 1803, imprisoned in the tower of Dublin Castle. He was so appalled by the condition in which he found her that he arranged her immediate release.

Long took office in the Portland ministry as paymaster-general of the forces after Pitt's death in 1806, a post he retained until 1826 when he retired from politics. He was offered the Chancellorship of the Exchequer and the Secretaryship at War by Perceval, both of which he refused, considering himself neither inclined nor fit to fill either position. Except on matters arising from his ministerial responsibilities, he rarely spoke in the House of Commons. Rather than an initiator of policy, his strengths lay in his loyal and efficient political adjudications. In 1792 with Sir James Bland Burges, Long established the Sun newspaper as an instrument of the Tories, and he was the author of pamphlets on the French Revolution (1795) and the price of bread (1800).

In 1820 King George IV made Long a Knight of the Bath, and on his retirement from political life in 1826 he was raised to the peerage as "Baron Farnborough, of Bromley-Hill-Place, in the county of Kent". (Farnborough was then a village in Kent, near his country residence). Long was elected FRS in 1792, FSA in 1812, and was given an honorary LLD by his old university in 1833. The arts were Long's real passion, but due to limited resources he was unable to be a major patron or collector in his own right, however, as a minister and MP he was influential in furthering artistic causes such as the establishment of the National Gallery and the purchase of the Elgin marbles, and was a founder of the British Institution in 1805. He acted as intermediary in 1792 between Pitt and Humphry Repton over improvements to the former's grounds at Holwood, and in 1799 when the Altieri Claudes were brought to England, they were first exhibited to English connoisseurs at Long's house in Grosvenor Place. In subsequent years he maintained a high profile in connection with his public patronage of the arts. A committee of taste was appointed in 1802 to supervise the erection of monuments to the heroes of the Napoleonic wars, of which Long was chairman, and in 1809 the responsibilities were extended to the repair of Henry VII's chapel at Westminster, with money voted by parliament. Long was consulted on everything from the need for a fig-leaf on the heroic statue honouring the Duke of Wellington, that had been subscribed for by the ladies of Great Britain (1821), to the appropriate order for the facade of the privy council offices in Whitehall (1824).

Retirement from politics 

Long's political ambitions were modest, though his retirement was nevertheless, a reluctant one. His reputation as an arbiter of taste led in 1834, to the opening of a campaign for the establishment of an Institution of British Architects, by way of an open letter to Lord Farnborough. He was an active trustee both of the British Museum and of the National Gallery, and as deputy director he was for many years a leading figure in the affairs of the British Institution. Long's advice on artistic matters was valued at the highest level. George IV, both as prince regent and as king, consulted him frequently over the commissioning of architecture, sculpture and painting. The prince's secretary once said that in matters of art, "The Prince Regent saw through Mr. Long's spectacles". Long negotiated royal commissions with artists such as Canova, Westmacott, and Lawrence, and when the king decided to reconstruct Windsor Castle, Long drew up a brief which detailed every important feature of the castle as subsequently remodelled by Jeffry Wyattville, from the formation of the Grand Corridor to the heightening of the keep, and he also made a sketch-plan in 1823 for the sunken garden below the east terrace.

Only a few miles from Pitt's at Holwood, Long's own country villa at Bromley Hill in Kent was an elegant enlargement of an earlier house which he bought in 1801. He and his wife were amateur artists and architects, and provided their own designs for the improvement to the house. The extensive grounds were progressively improved to create a much-admired garden which by 1809 offered two picturesque walks, each a mile long, and a distant view of the dome of St Paul's Cathedral. It was here that Long entertained George IV, William IV, and Queen Adelaide. He died here on 17 January 1838, leaving to the National Gallery fifteen artworks by Rubens, Vandyck, Canaletto, Teniers, Mola, Cuyp, and others.

Lady Farnborough 

Long married in 1793 Amelia Hume, eldest daughter of the prominent art collector Sir Abraham Hume, 2nd Baronet, by Amelia, daughter of John Egerton, Bishop of Durham. A watercolourist and garden designer, she completed her formal classical education with a visit to Italy, prior to her marriage. She designed the celebrated Italianate grounds at their country residence Bromley Hill, which subsequently became the main source for her sketches. Reputed to be the favourite pupil of Thomas Girtin, her early work is distinguished by a broad topographical style, and later work was influenced by Henry Edridge and Dr Thomas Monro. She died 15 January 1837, and a London newspaper reported that her husband Lord Farnborough was "dangerously ill in consequence of a shock occasioned by the death of his lady". He never properly recovered his health, and died a year later. There were no children from the marriage.

References

Sources 
 Dictionary of National Biography Long, Charles, Baron Farnborough, by Howard Colvin

1760 births
1838 deaths
Charles
Fellows of the Society of Antiquaries of London
Alumni of Emmanuel College, Cambridge
Members of the Parliament of Great Britain for English constituencies
Members of the Privy Council of Great Britain
Members of the Privy Council of Ireland
Tory MPs (pre-1834)
Barons in the Peerage of the United Kingdom
Fellows of the Royal Society
English art collectors
Knights Grand Cross of the Order of the Bath
Members of the Parliament of the United Kingdom for English constituencies
British MPs 1784–1790
British MPs 1790–1796
British MPs 1796–1800
UK MPs 1801–1802
UK MPs 1802–1806
UK MPs 1806–1807
UK MPs 1807–1812
UK MPs 1812–1818
UK MPs 1818–1820
UK MPs 1820–1826
UK MPs who were granted peerages
Commissioners of the Treasury for Ireland
Chief Secretaries for Ireland
Peers of the United Kingdom created by George IV